Nimani is a surname. Notable people with the surname include:

 Fadil Nimani (1967–2001), Kosovo Liberation Army commander
 Frédéric Nimani (born 1988), French footballer
 Fuad Nimani, Montenegrin-Albanian politician
 Shyqri Nimani (born 1941), Albanian graphic designer
 Zana Nimani (born 1961), Serbian singer
 Valdan Nimani (born 1987), an Albanian football player

Ni'Mani